N-Benzyl-2C-B (25B-NB, NB-2C-B) is a recreational designer drug from the 25-NB subgroup of the substituted phenethylamine family, with psychedelic effects. It has a binding affinity (Ki) of 16 nM at the serotonin receptor 5-HT2A and 90 nM at 5-HT2C and reportedly has a potency in between that of 2C-B and NBOMe-2C-B.

See also 
 N-Ethyl-2C-B
 25B-NBF
 25B-NBOH

References 

Bromoarenes
Designer drugs
Psychedelic phenethylamines
Serotonin receptor agonists
Methoxy compounds